Storm Across Europe is a grand strategy video game written by Dan Cermak and released for the Commodore 64 in 1989 by Strategic Simulations. Versions for the Amiga and MS-DOS followed in 1990. The game covers World War II in Europe on a grand strategic scale between 1939 and 1945.

Gameplay
Three major powers are playable: Germany (Axis), the Allies and the Soviet Union. However, Germany cannot be played by the computer. In the game you are in charge of your chosen major power and its land, air and naval forces. You also control production and research of military equipment.

The map covers Europe, North Africa and Middle East and the Baltic, North Sea, eastern Atlantic, Mediterranean, Black Sea and Persian Gulf. The map covers 224 areas and 37 different countries. Each area has different terrain (affecting combat), and possible manpower, raw materials and industry (needed for production and research).

Reception
Compute! stated that the Commodore 64 version of Storm Across Europe was "one of the best games of the year", approving of the game's strategic emphasis. Computer Gaming World gave the game three stars out of five. The magazine stated that despite the "8-bit" graphics and user interface, Storm Across Europe might appeal to fans of Colonial Conquest and those looking for a strategy game they could complete relatively quickly; Clash of Steel, however, "makes this embarrassingly unplayable".

References

External links

Storm Across Europe at Amiga Hall of Light

1989 video games
Amiga games
Commodore 64 games
DOS games
Computer wargames
Video games developed in the United States
World War II video games
World War II grand strategy computer games
Turn-based strategy video games
Strategic Simulations games
Grand strategy video games